Loïc Guilvic Gagnon (born 21 January 1991) is a French professional footballer who plays as a winger for Championnat National 2 club Granville.

Career
Gagnon made his Fortuna Liga debut for Spartak Trnava against Šport Podbrezová on 17 July 2016.

On 11 January 2022, Gagnon signed for French side Granville.

References

External links
 FC Spartak Trnava official club profile
 Fortuna Liga profile
 
 Eurofotbal profile
 Futbalnet profile

1991 births
Sportspeople from Bondy
Living people
French footballers
Association football midfielders
Villemomble Sports players
Championnat National 2 players
2. Liga (Slovakia) players
Slovak Super Liga players
Liga II players
Championnat National 3 players
AS Monaco FC players
OGC Nice players
US Ivry players
Partizán Bardejov players
FC Spartak Trnava players
CS Sportul Snagov players
Vendée Poiré-sur-Vie Football players
AS Vitré players
US Granville players
French expatriate footballers
Expatriate footballers in Slovakia
Expatriate footballers in Romania
French expatriate sportspeople in Slovakia
French expatriate sportspeople in Romania
Footballers from Seine-Saint-Denis